National Route 5 (in Spanish, Ruta Nacional Número 5 "Gral. Bernardino Caballero", or simply Ruta Quinta) is a highway in northern Paraguay, it runs from Fortín Pilcomayo to Pedro Juan Caballero. It crosses 3 departments, Presidente Hayes, Concepcion, and Amambay.

Distances and important cities

The following table shows the distances traversed by National Route 5 in each different department, and important cities that it passes by (or near).

5
Presidente Hayes Department
Concepción Department, Paraguay
Amambay Department